Armand Jammot (4 April 1922 – 19 April 1998) was a French television producer. He produced a number of shows, most notably Les Dossiers de l'Écran, and in 1965, he created Des chiffres et des lettres.

In 1982, Yorkshire Television was given permission to produce Countdown, a British version of Des chiffres et des lettres. This show continues to the present day.

See also 
 Le Huitième Art et la Manière (1952)

1922 births
1998 deaths
French television producers
People from Alfortville